Tupua Tamasese Mea'ole  (3 June 1905 – 5 April 1963) was a Western Samoan paramount chief. He held the royal title of Tupua Tamasese from 1929 to 1963, and O le Ao o le Malo (Head of State) jointly with Malietoa Tanumafili II from 1962 until his death the following year.

Biography
He was born in Vaimoso 1905 as the one of three sons of the paramount chief Tupua Tamasese Lealofi II. He was educated at the Marist school in Apia. In 1929, he was installed as Tupua Tamasese when his elder brother and Mau leader, Tupua Tamasese Lealofi III was assassinated by colonial police during a Mau parade in Apia.

He married Noue in 1934, a daughter of Olaf Frederick Nelson. The couple had four children; two daughters and two sons. In 1936 he was appointed to the Legislative Council, and in 1938 he was appointed as one of the Fautua (advisor to the Administrator). In the same year he became president of the Mau. As a Fautua, he continued to serve in the Legislative Council and its successor, the Legislative Assembly until 1957. He was also a member of the Council of State and the Executive Council until 1959.

Away from politics, Tamasese was involved in business, serving as chair of the board of the Western Samoa Trust Estates Corporation, a director of the Bank of Western Samoa and a member of the Copra Board. In 1953, he was awarded the Queen Elizabeth II Coronation Medal. In the 1957 New Year Honours he was appointed a Commander of the Order of the British Empire.

In preparations for independence, Tamasese chaired the constitutional conventions of 1954 and 1960. When Western Samoa attained independence in 1962, the new constitution made Tupua Tamasese and Malietoa Tanumafili II (the two Fautua) joint heads of state.

Upon Tamasese's death in April 1963, Malietoa continued to serve as sole head of state, whilst the title of Tupua Tamasese was passed to his eldest nephew, Tupua Tamasese Lealofi IV, who would go on to become the second Prime Minister of Samoa.

References

1905 births
Members of the Legislative Council of Samoa
Members of the Legislative Assembly of Samoa
Commanders of the Order of the British Empire
O le Ao o le Malo of Samoa
1963 deaths
People from Tuamasaga